The Final Nexus is a 1988 science fiction novel by American writer Gene DeWeese, part of the Star Trek: The Original Series franchise.

Plot
In this sequel to Chain of Attack, the Enterprise must deal with an ancient series of warp-gates, now malfunctioning, that threatens to tear apart the galaxy.

Reception
The Final Nexus reached 12 on the New York Times bestseller list on December 11, 1988.

References

External links

Novels based on Star Trek: The Original Series
1988 American novels
American science fiction novels
Novels by Gene DeWeese